Current Pharmaceutical Design is a peer-reviewed medical journal which covers issues related to pharmacology and medicinal chemistry. Each issue is devoted to a single major therapeutic area. For each issue, an executive editor is chosen who is an acknowledged authority in that field.

Abstracting and indexing 
Current Pharmaceutical Design is abstracted and indexed in:

According to the Journal Citation Reports, the journal has a 2019 impact factor of 2.208.

References

External links 
 

Publications established in 1995
Pharmacology journals
English-language journals
Bentham Science Publishers academic journals